Lianema tenuicornis is a species of Insect in the family Cerambycidae, the only species in the genus Lianema.

References

Graciliini
Monotypic Cerambycidae genera